Crinolamia angustispira is a species of sea snail, a marine gastropod mollusk in the family Eulimidae.

Description
The length of the shell attains 3 mm.

Distribution
This species occurs in the following locations:
 European waters (ERMS scope) (Northeast Atlantic Ocean)
 United Kingdom Exclusive Economic Zone

References

 Bouchet, P. & Warén, A., 1986. Revision of the northeast Atlantic bathyal and abyssal Aclididae, Eulimidae, Epitoniidae. Bollettino Malacologico: 297-576, sér. Suppl.2
 Gofas, S.; Le Renard, J.; Bouchet, P. (2001). Mollusca. in: Costello, M.J. et al. (eds), European Register of Marine Species: a check-list of the marine species in Europe and a bibliography of guides to their identification. Patrimoines Naturels. 50: 180-213.
 Sysoev A.V. (2014). Deep-sea fauna of European seas: An annotated species check-list of benthic invertebrates living deeper than 2000 m in the seas bordering Europe. Gastropoda. Invertebrate Zoology. Vol.11. No.1: 134–155

External links
 Bouchet, P. & Warén, A. (1986). Revision of the Northeast Atlantic bathyal and abyssal Aclididae Eulimidae, Epitonidae (Mollusca, Gastropoda). Bollettino Malacologico. suppl. 2: 297-576
 To World Register of Marine Species

Eulimidae
Gastropods described in 1986